Lindley John Forbes Barraclough  (3 September 1926 – 13 December 2005) was an Australian politician, representing the electoral district of Bligh in the New South Wales Legislative Assembly from 1968 to 1981.

References

 

Members of the New South Wales Legislative Assembly
Liberal Party of Australia members of the Parliament of New South Wales
Members of the Order of Australia
1926 births
2005 deaths
20th-century Australian politicians